Marion Watson Stewart  (1898–1983) was a notable New Zealand poultry farmer and promoter, community leader. She was born in Manchester, Lancashire, England, in 1898.

In the 1972 Queen's Birthday Honours, Stewart was appointed a Member of the New Zealand Order of Merit, for services to the community.

References

1898 births
1983 deaths
New Zealand farmers
English emigrants to New Zealand
New Zealand Members of the Order of the British Empire
People from Manchester